The 1950–51 season was the 67th Scottish football season in which Dumbarton competed at national level, entering the Scottish Football League, the Scottish Cup and the Scottish League Cup.  In addition Dumbarton competed in the Stirlingshire Cup and the Stirlingshire Consolation Cup.

Scottish League

The league campaign looked to be following those of recent years, with the first win registered after 8 attempts, however a late burst of 5 wins in the final 6 games saw Dumbarton finish in a creditable 9th place (out of 16) with 29 points, 16 behind champions Queen of the South.

Scottish Cup

The Scottish Cup saw Dumbarton exit early to St Johnstone in the first round.

Scottish League Cup

In the League Cup, qualification from the sectional games still proved a problem, finishing 4th and last, with a win and two draws being taken from their 6 games.

Stirlingshire Cup
In the Stirlingshire Cup, Stirling Albion overcame Dumbarton in the semi final after two draws.

Stirlingshire Consolation Cup
In a short-lived revival of the Stirlingshire Consolation Cup (a competition for those clubs eliminated early in the previous season's Stirlingshire Cup) Dumbarton finished as runners-up, again to Stirling Albion.

Player statistics

|}

Source:

Transfers

Players in

Players out 

Source:

Reserve team
For the second successive season, Dumbarton played a reserve team in Division C (South West) and finished 15th out of 16, recording 7 wins and 4 draws from 30 matches.  Note that in addition to the reserve sides of the bigger Division A teams in South and West Scotland, the first teams of East Stirlingshire (relegated from Division B two seasons previously) and Stranraer also competed in this league.

In the Second XI Cup, Dumbarton lost in the first round to Hamilton.

Finally in the Reserve League Cup, with only a single win from 6 sectional matches, Dumbarton failed to qualify for the knock-out stages.

References

Dumbarton F.C. seasons
Scottish football clubs 1950–51 season